Eric Barnes may refer to:

Sports
Eric Barnes (footballer) (1937–2014), English footballer
Eric Barnes (soccer), American soccer player and coach
Eric Barnes (rugby league) (1940–2019), Australian rugby league footballer
Eric Randolph Barnes or Randy Barnes, (born 1966), American olympic shot putter

Others
Eric Barnes (writer) (born 1968), American writer
Eric Stephen Barnes (1924–2000), Australian mathematician  
Eric Wollencott Barnes (1907–1962), American educator, diplomat, actor, and author

See also
Erik Barnes (born 1987), American golfer
Erich Barnes (1935–2022), American football player